Udyog Vihar is an industrial estate in Gurgaon, Haryana, having more than 1200 industrial and commercial units.

Background
The estate is  including all phases.

Connectivity
Roads: Udyog Vihar is well designed, and having well connected roads. Companies using charted buses and cabs for their employee, which is near Delhi Gurgaon Expressway, NH 8.

Rapid metro: Rapid Metro Gurgaon is another transport option available. The nearest Rapid Metro Station is DLF Phase III.

Rapid Metro Station DLF Phase III is connected to the Sikanderpur metro station. From here it is connected to different parts of Gurgaon and Delhi.

Detail of phases
Udyog Vihar is further divided into five phases.
 Udyog Vihar Phase I
 Udyog Vihar Phase II
 Udyog Vihar Phase III
 Udyog Vihar Phase IV
 Udyog Vihar Phase v

References

Economy of Gurgaon
Industrial parks in India